Nicole Daedone founded and became the CEO of OneTaste in the San Francisco Bay Area. OneTaste trademarked the "orgasmic meditation" (OM) procedure delivered through the company's classes. Born in Los Gatos, California, she holds a bachelor's degree in gender communications from San Francisco State University. She studied with teachers of yoga and Buddhist meditation, and with Ray Vetterlein, who was in turn inspired by Morehouse.

OneTaste has been investigated by the FBI for prostitution, sex trafficking, and violations of labor law. Daedone is the focus of a Netflix documentary called "Orgasm Inc: The Story of OneTaste".

Controversy
Former members of the organization testifying about their experience at OneTaste said it "resembled a kind of prostitution ring" where managers frequently ordered staffers to engage in sexual relations with customers. In 2015, a former employee received a six-figure settlement for sexual assault and harassment. The company made $18 million in revenue in 2017.

Publications

References 

American non-fiction writers
American people in the sex industry
Living people
People from Los Gatos, California
American relationships and sexuality writers
San Francisco State University alumni
Women business executives
Writers from California
Year of birth missing (living people)
American women non-fiction writers
21st-century American women